Amos Kollie (born 18 July 1990) is a Liberian footballer currently playing for Hapoel Kfar Saba.

Career

Club 

Kollie started his professional career with boyhood club, LISCR. After 2 years he signed with the Israeli side Hapoel Nazareth Illit.

On August 26, 2011 Kollie signed a contract with Hapoel Haifa.

External links

Living people
1990 births
Liberian footballers
LISCR FC players
Hapoel Nof HaGalil F.C. players
Hapoel Haifa F.C. players
Hapoel Kfar Saba F.C. players
Beitar Tel Aviv Bat Yam F.C. players
Liga Leumit players
Israeli Premier League players
Expatriate footballers in Israel
Sportspeople from Monrovia
Association football forwards